Crossfade is the debut album by American rock band Crossfade. It was released on April 13, 2004 by Columbia. The album reached number 41 on the Billboard 200 and spawned three singles: "Cold", "So Far Away", and "Colors". It was certified platinum by the Recording Industry Association of America (RIAA), denoting sales of over a million copies in that country.

Background
It was released on April 13, 2004, five years after they were formed. The album was also released as a DualDisc CD that includes extra content not found on the original, standard edition. The album was certified Platinum in the United States.

The singles from this album helped launch the band to mainstream success. "Cold" remains the band's biggest hit, reaching number two on the Modern Rock Tracks chart and number three on the Mainstream Rock Tracks, and is also their only single to chart on the Billboard Hot 100, at number 81. Follow-up singles "So Far Away" and "Colors" charted in the top 10 of the Mainstream Rock chart, at number four and number six, respectively. They also hit the top 20 of the Modern Rock chart ("So Far Away" at number 14, "Colors" at number 18).

Track listing 
All tracks written by Ed Sloan.

Personnel 
Crossfade
 Ed Sloan – guitars, lead vocals
 Tony Byroads – turntables, background and lead vocals
 Mitchell James – bass guitar, background vocals
 Brian Geiger – drums, percussion

Production
 Crossfade – producer, engineer, art direction
 Doug Ford – A&R
 Bryan Gallant – assistant
 Matt Pinfield – A&R
 Mick Rock – photography
 Randy Staub – engineer, mixing

Charts and certifications

Weekly charts

Year-end charts

Certifications

Singles

Appearances 
The song "So Far Away" was featured in the video game ATV Offroad Fury 3 in 2004.
The song "Death Trend Setta" was featured in the video game Gretzky NHL 2005 in 2004.
The song "Cold" was featured in the video game MX vs. ATV Unleashed in 2005.

References 

2004 debut albums
Crossfade (band) albums
Columbia Records albums